Elm Spring Farm is a historic home and farm located in Jefferson Township, Morgan County, Indiana.  The farmhouse was built about 1844, and is a -story, single pen log dwelling with a frame kitchen addition. Also on the property are the contributing single corn crib converted to a garage, second single corn crib, privy, brick outdoor fireplace, spring, and sandstone abutments for two absent foot bridges.  The building represents an assemblage of pioneer log buildings.  During the 1930s, the Civilian Conservation Corps was hired to reforest the farm.  The property has also been used as a Girl Scout camp.

It was listed on the National Register of Historic Places in 2001.

References

Civilian Conservation Corps in Indiana
Farms on the National Register of Historic Places in Indiana
Houses completed in 1844
Houses in Morgan County, Indiana
National Register of Historic Places in Morgan County, Indiana
Local council camps of the Girls Scouts of the USA